Lotamore House is a Georgian house in Cork, Ireland, which used as a residence by several Cork merchant families before being turned into a number of businesses. Used as guesthouse for several years, by the beginning of the 21st century the house had fallen into disrepair, It was, however, renovated and reopened as a fertility clinic in 2017.

House
The original land belonged to John and William Galway and was leased to Robert and George Rogers, detailed in leases dated 1694 and 1720. The central structure is a 2-storey Georgian house built by the Rogers family of Lota in the late 18th century, and extended in the Victorian 1880s. It is on a hill with views overlooking the River Lee. The house was let to the Honourable C.L. Bernard in 1837 and Frederick Hamilton nearer the middle of the 19th century. Sir William Bartholomew Hackett was the tenant near the latter end of the century before the house was sold to the Perrier family, a merchant family of Huguenot origin, and later Martin Francis Mahony and his descendants. The list of names also shown as private residents includes Harrison, Hackett, Lunham and Cudmore.

After 1961 when the house was no longer a family residence it served as the offices of the Irish Hospital Sweepstakes before becoming a twenty-room guesthouse which closed in 2006. Further development was halted with the downturn in the economy. Though the house was sold, the new owners went into receivership through Deloitte. There was a period when the house was occupied by the protest group, the Rodolphus Allen Family Private Trust. After the court case ended and the squatters were removed the house was eventually sold again. Between 2013 and 2017 it was renovated and expanded, and redeveloped as an "advanced" fertility clinic.

See also
List of historic houses in the Republic of Ireland

References

Buildings and structures in County Cork
Georgian architecture in Ireland